Otidea leporina is a species of fungus in the family Pyronemataceae. It was given its current name by Karl Wilhelm Gottlieb Leopold Fuckel in 1870. It contains toxins which may cause serious gastric upset.

References

External links

Fungi described in 1783
Poisonous fungi
Pyronemataceae
Taxa named by August Batsch